Jesús Armando Amaya Contreras (born 24 August 1969) is a Colombian professional golfer.

Amaya was born in Bogotá, and worked as a caddie at the Club Popular de Golf La Florida before turning professional in 1991.

In addition to his many victories on the Colombian Golf Federation circuit, including three Colombian Open titles, Amaya has won six times on the Tour de las Americas, finishing second on the Order of Merit in 2000–01, and fourth in 2001–02. In 2015, he won his 100th tournament.

Amaya has represented Colombia on five occasions at the World Cup.

Professional wins (46)

Tour de las Américas wins (7)
 2000 Coast Open (Argentina), Brazil Open
 2002 Medellín Open (Colombia), Microsoft Serrezuela Masters (Colombia), Venezuela Open
 2007 Venezuela Open
 2010 Abierto Internacional de Golf Copa Sura (Colombia)

PGA Tour Latinoamérica Developmental Series wins (1)

Colombian wins (36)
This list is incomplete
 1993 Colombian Open, Campeonato Nacional de Profesionales, CC Medellín Open
 1994 Caribbean Open (Barranquilla)
 2003 Los Andes GC Open, Pereira Open
 2004 Barranquilla Open, Colombian Open, Petrolero Open, CC Cali Open, CC Guaymaral Tournament (with Gustavo Mendoza)
 2005 Serrezuela Open, Pueblo Viejo CC Open, Farallones Open, CC Medellín Open, Colombian Open, Caribbean Open (Barranquilla), GC Peñalisa Open, Carmel Club Open
 2006 CC Armenia Open, Manizales Open, Serrezuela Open, Colombian National Championship, GC Peñalisa Open
 2007 CC Cali Open
 2008 CC La Sabana Open, CC El Rancho Open, Carmel Club Open
 2010 Medellín Open
 2012 Caribbean Open
 2013 CC Medellín Open
 2014 CC Cali Open
 2015 Carmel Club Open, Barranquilla Open
 2016 CC Neiva Open, CC El Rancho Open

Other wins (2)
2010 Dominican Republic Open
2015 Chiapas Golf Challenge (Mexico)

Team appearances
World Cup (representing Colombia): 1995, 1997, 1999, 2000, 2002

References

External links

Profile on the Colombian Golf Federation's official site

Colombian male golfers
Sportspeople from Bogotá
1969 births
Living people
20th-century Colombian people